Meghan Elizabeth Gardler (born April 11, 1988) is an American women's basketball player who played professional basketball in Europe. She won two National Championships with the UConn Huskies, then continued to play basketball in Sweden and Luxembourg. She won Diekirch League MVP in the 2012–2013 season and averaged 26.7 ppg. She graduated from Cardinal O'Hara High School and was named Philadelphia Catholic MVP. From 2006 to 2010 Gardler played for Connecticut Huskies. In 2010, she started her pro career in Sweden (KFUM Umea Comets).

Connecticut  statistics

Source

References 

http://meghangardler.com

External links 
 Connecticut profile
 Eurobasket profile

1988 births
Living people
American women's basketball players
Centers (basketball)
Power forwards (basketball)
UConn Huskies women's basketball players